Scott Horsley is an American radio journalist. He is the Chief Economics Correspondent for National Public Radio.

Early life, family and education
Horsley was raised in Denver, Colorado, graduating from its Manual High School. He earned a bachelor's degree at Harvard University, then an MBA at San Diego State University.

Career
Horsley began his career in 1987 as a production assistant, cutting tape overnight for NPR's Morning Edition news radio program. He worked at public radio stations KPBS-FM in San Diego, California, covering business and economic issues; and at WUSF in Tampa, Florida, WKXL in Concord, New Hampshire as well as another commercial radio station in Boston, Massachusetts, and Concord, New Hampshire.

Horsley joined National Public Radio in 2001. He covered presidential campaigns of John Kerry, John McCain and Mitt Romney. Moving back to Washington, DC, he covered the White House for NPR during the US Presidencies of Barack Obama and Donald Trump.

Honors and awards
Public Radio News Directors' Award

Personal life

References

External links

Harvard College alumni
San Diego State University alumni
Year of birth missing (living people)
Living people
American radio journalists
Journalists from Colorado
People from Denver
20th-century American journalists
21st-century American journalists